Regina Markell Morantz-Sanchez is an American historian, and professor at University of Michigan.

Early life and education
She graduated from Barnard College in 1965 and a Ph.D. from Columbia University in 1971.

Awards
1997 Margaret W. Rossiter History of Women in Science Prize
1999 Research Award, from Institute for Research on Women and Gender

Works
In Her Own Words: Oral Histories of Women Physicians, Greenwood Publishing Group, 1982, ; 1985.
Sympathy and Science: Women Physicians in American Medicine, Oxford University Press, 1985, ; UNC Press, 2000, 
Conduct Unbecoming a Woman: Medicine on Trial in Turn of the Century Brooklyn, Oxford University Press US, 2000, 
"The Female Student has Arrived", Send us a lady physician: women doctors in America, 1835-1920, Editor Ruth J. Abram, W. W. Norton & Company, 1985, 
"The Connecting Link: The Case for the Woman Doctor in 19th-Century America", Sickness and health in America: readings in the history of medicine and public health, Editors Judith Walzer Leavitt, Ronald L. Numbers, University of Wisconsin Press, 1997,

References

Year of birth missing (living people)
Living people
American women historians
Barnard College alumni
Columbia University alumni
University of Michigan faculty
21st-century American historians
21st-century American women writers